CSN International is relayed by numerous low-powered translators nationwide. As a religious station, CSN International flagship KAWZ is allowed to place translators anywhere in the United States, regardless of distance from its parent station's coverage area.

Alabama

Alaska

Arizona

Arkansas

California

Colorado

Florida

Georgia

Hawaii

Idaho

Illinois

Indiana

Iowa

Kansas

Kentucky

Louisiana

Maryland

Michigan

Minnesota

Mississippi

Missouri

Montana

Nebraska

Nevada 

The Sun Valley translator is unusual in that translators are not normally allowed on the 87.9 frequency. The translator was originally licensed at 88.1 MHz, but was allowed to move to 87.9 MHz to avoid interfering with 88.3 in Sparks, Nevada.

New Jersey

New Mexico

New York

North Carolina

North Dakota

Ohio

Oklahoma

Oregon

Pennsylvania

South Carolina

South Dakota

Tennessee

Texas

Utah

Virginia

Washington

Wisconsin

Wyoming 

Christian radio stations in the United States
American radio networks